Bostonia is a neighborhood in San Diego County, California, comprising part of the northeastern portion of the city of El Cajon, as well as adjacent unincorporated areas of San Diego County. The portion of Bostonia that lies outside the El Cajon city limits is classified as a census-designated place (CDP) for statistical purposes by the United States Census Bureau. The population of the CDP was 15,379 at the 2010 census, up from 15,169 at the 2000 census.

History

Agriculture
Former Virginia agriculturalist Eugene Halstead of San Diego planted a crop of tobacco in Bostonia in 1896 and said later that the tobacco was "superior in some respects to that of the Cuban plantations," one "serious drawback" to cultivation being the scarcity of rain in the area.

Civic events

In 1898, David G. Gordon was appointed postmaster in Bostonia to replace Joseph Donald, who had resigned. C.O. Graves held the office in 1903. In 1914, William M. Wright was appointed postmaster to replace R.W. Foffland, who had resigned.

In 1928, Murray Wright was president of the Bostonia Chamber of Commerce.

In that same year, civic leaders in Bostonia planned to name a local observation as "Grape Day" which led some in neighboring Escondido to complain that their city already had an event under the same name. They were mollified when Bostonians said they would call their event "Home Products Day" instead.

Crime
"Firebugs" believed by Sheriff Conklin to have been members of the Industrial Workers of the World, "German sympathizers" or "disgruntled employees," torched the Meridian School building, a large packing house and two stables of the Bostonia Fruit Growers and Packers Association on October 6, 1917. Waste soaked in oil or phosphorus was found in what remained of the buildings, which burned to the ground.

Shoot-out

Sheriff's deputies engaged in a short gun battle in Bostonia and captured a suicidal man who had threatened a bank in Lakeside, California, with ten pounds of dynamite and fled with his loot.

Annexation
In May 1953 residents of the southern portion of Bostonia approved annexation to the city of El Cajon, California, by a vote of 315 to 271.

Swap meet
In 1981 a group of Bostonia residents organized to complain about the disruption caused by historic El Cajon Swap Meet, reputedly the "granddaddy of all the nation's swap meets. They said the weekend operation had grown beyond the "small-time affair it once was," turning the usually quiet area into a "mob scene."

Fire district and fires
A petition was submitted in 1977 by owners of 112 acres within the 480-acre Bostonia Fire Protection District to secede and join the Santee district. It was denied by the Local Agency Formation Commission. 

In 1986, a fire in nearby El Cajon killed two and injured five residents at a home for the aged despite the fact that it broke out only a hundred yards from a station within the Bostonia Fire Protection District.

The Bostonia firefighters were prevented from battling the blaze because the district had no mutual-aid agreement with El Cajon, whose firefighters arrived three minutes after the fire was reported. El Cajon Fire Chief Art Melbourne said that Bostonia firefighters did give help but declined to say exactly what it was.

El Cajon Fire Chief Roger House said that Bostonia was not part of any agreement because it did not meet the requirements for belonging, including round-the-clock staffing and a certain kind of equipment.

Geography 
The center of the community is near the intersection of North 2nd Street and Broadway in the city of El Cajon. Bostonia Street, the Bostonia Post Office, the former Bostonia Ballroom, Bostonia Elementary School and the Bostonia Fire Station are all within  of this location and all, except the fire station, are within the city of El Cajon. This is the area identified on most maps as Bostonia. However, the census-designated place of Bostonia is entirely outside the city limits of El Cajon, in an unincorporated area of County. The CDP comprises most of unincorporated El Cajon north of Broadway and east of State Route 67, and a small area west of State Route 67. Mail sent to all parts of Bostonia is addressed to El Cajon.

According to the United States Census Bureau Bostonia is located at  (32.821612, -116.949905). This is approximately one mile northwest of where the USGS places Bostonia, near the geographic center of the CDP.

Ecology 
Bostonia was home to numerous populations of Ambrosia pumila, a rare, clonal plant narrowly distributed in southern California and Baja California. Most populations of Ambrosia pumila in Bostonia grew on vacant lots, backyard strips, and gravel roads, and many since have been extirpated by development. Additionally, Artemisia palmeri, a sagebrush nearly endemic to San Diego County, was once found in the neighborhood. Other plants historically collected from Bostonia include Primula clevelandii, Sidalcea malviflora, Sisyrinchium bellum and Viola pedunculata.

Demographics 

The statistics below include only the census-designated place, not the part of Bostonia within the city limits of El Cajon.

2010 
At the 2010 census Bostonia had a population of 15,379. The racial makeup of Bostonia was 10,891 (70.8%) White, 1,011 (6.6%) African American, 102 (0.7%) Native American, 375 (2.4%) Asian, 89 (0.6%) Pacific Islander, 1,781 (11.6%) from other races, and 1,130 (7.3%) from two or more races. Hispanic or Latino of any race were 3,941 persons (25.6%).

The census reported that 15,272 people (99.3% of the population) lived in households, 55 (0.4%) lived in non-institutionalized group quarters, and 52 (0.3%) were institutionalized.

There were 5,573 households, 2,028 (36.4%) had children under the age of 18 living in them, 2,381 (42.7%) were opposite-sex married couples living together, 976 (17.5%) had a female householder with no husband present, 405 (7.3%) had a male householder with no wife present.  There were 416 (7.5%) unmarried opposite-sex partnerships, and 47 (0.8%) same-sex married couples or partnerships. 1,338 households (24.0%) were one person and 545 (9.8%) had someone living alone who was 65 or older. The average household size was 2.74.  There were 3,762 families (67.5% of households); the average family size was 3.25.

The age distribution was 3,813 people (24.8%) under the age of 18, 1,820 people (11.8%) aged 18 to 24, 4,157 people (27.0%) aged 25 to 44, 3,832 people (24.9%) aged 45 to 64, and 1,757 people (11.4%) who were 65 or older.  The median age was 33.8 years. For every 100 females, there were 94.6 males.  For every 100 females age 18 and over, there were 90.9 males.

There were 5,893 housing units at an average density of 3,055.3 per square mile, of the occupied units 2,342 (42.0%) were owner-occupied and 3,231 (58.0%) were rented. The homeowner vacancy rate was 2.9%; the rental vacancy rate was 5.5%.  6,071 people (39.5% of the population) lived in owner-occupied housing units and 9,201 people (59.8%) lived in rental housing units.

2000 
At the 2000 census there were 15,169 people, 5,640 households, and 3,778 families in the CDP. The population density was 7,810.2 inhabitants per square mile (3,019.0/km). The racial makeup of the CDP was 79.81% White, 3.98% African American, 0.90% Native American, 1.48% Asian, 0.36% Pacific Islander, 7.79% from other races, and 5.68% from two or more races. Hispanic or Latino of any race were 16.63%.

Of the 5,640 households 37.0% had children under the age of 18 living with them, 47.0% were married couples living together, 14.2% had a female householder with no husband present, and 33.0% were non-families. 24.3% of households were one person and 10.5% had someone living alone who was 65 years of age or older.  The average household size was 2.67 and the average family size was 3.19.

The age distribution was 28.3% under the age of 18, 10.7% from 18 to 24, 31.8% from 25 to 44, 17.7% from 45 to 64, and 11.6% who were 65 years of age or older.  The median age was 32 years. For every 100 females there were 96.2 males.  For every 100 females age 18 and over, there were 91.9 males.

The median household income was $37,148, and the median family income  was $41,727. Males had a median income of $32,240 versus $26,335 for females. The per capita income for the CDP was $17,328.  About 9.1% of families and 12.5% of the population were below the poverty line, including 14.9% of those under age 18 and 7.4% of those age 65 or over.

Religion

A new Episcopal Church (United States) was dedicated in Bostonia on July 28, 1895, the Rev. H.B. Restarick officiating. Later, Alfred Fletcher took charge of the church  under Restarick, who had become dean. W.J. Cleveland took over as rector in November 1910.

Government 

Education
The Riverview School District was separated from the Bostonia District (which included Lakeside) in 1919.

References

Census-designated places in San Diego County, California
East County (San Diego County)
Census-designated places in California